John Russell (14 October 1670 – 5 December 1735) was an administrator of the English East India Company.

Life
The posthumous third son of Sir John Russell, 3rd Baronet and Frances Cromwell, he was on his mother's side a grandson of Oliver Cromwell. He was elected a factor of the East India Company in 1693, and went to Bengal in 1694.

Russell served as President of Bengal, succeeding Anthony Weltden in the post in 1711.

Family

On 17 December 1697, Russell married Mary Eyre, sister of Sir Charles Eyre. They had one son and three daughters:

Col. Charles Russell (1700–1754), colonel of the 34th Regiment of Foot, married Mary Johanna Cutts Revett, daughter of Col. Edmund Revett, and had issue, including Sir John Russell, 8th Baronet
Frances Russell, married John Revett, son of Col. Edmund Revett, became bedchamber woman to Princess Amelia of Great Britain
Mary Russell, married Josiah Holmes, without issue
Elizabeth Russell, married Samuel Greenhill, mother of John Russell Greenhill

On 7 September 1715, after returning from India, he married Joanna, the daughter and heiress of John Thurbane, of Chequers, and widow of Col. Edmund Revett, who had inherited Chequers, now the British Prime Minister's country residence, from her father. They had one daughter, Anne, who died an infant. Chequers passed to his eldest son Charles.

References

1670 births
1735 deaths
Presidents of Bengal
English businesspeople
18th-century British people
Younger sons of baronets